Jessy Pi (born 24 September 1993) is a French professional footballer who plays as a defensive midfielder for Ligue 2 club Dijon.

Career
Pi made his Ligue 1 debut on 1 September 2013 in Monaco's 1–2 away win against Olympique Marseille. He replaced an injured Jérémy Toulalan after only 9 minutes. He has a contract till June 2017.

On 27 June 2014, Pi was loaned to the Ligue 2 side Troyes for the 2014–15 season. He was loaned to Troyes AC for a second season on 20 July 2015.

On 21 June 2016, Pi agreed to a four-year contract with Toulouse.

On 29 June 2019, Pi signed a two-year contract with Caen.

On 12 July 2021, he moved to Dijon on a two-year deal.

References

External links
 

1993 births
Living people
People from Manosque
French footballers
Association football defenders
French expatriate sportspeople in Monaco
Expatriate footballers in Monaco
Ligue 1 players
Ligue 2 players
AS Monaco FC players
ES Troyes AC players
Toulouse FC players
Stade Brestois 29 players
Stade Malherbe Caen players
Dijon FCO players
Sportspeople from Alpes-de-Haute-Provence
Footballers from Provence-Alpes-Côte d'Azur